Kallady is a village within the Batticaloa District of Eastern province of Sri Lanka. It lies north of Batticaloa city. As part of ongoing Sri Lankan civil war, the Kallady village has military installments. 2004 Tsunami affected the village resulting in major loss of life and property. It has the Samādhi of Swami Vipulananda a noted social reformer

Education
The RKM Shivananda National School is located here.

See also
 The American Batticaloa Development Fund, new coconut plantation after 2004 tsunami

References

External links
 RKM Shivananda National School
 www.kallady.com

Villages in Batticaloa District
Manmunai North DS Division